Blaise Sigibald Kurz (3 February 1894 in Sontheim — 13 December 1973 in Waldsassen) was a German Catholic bishop and a member of the Order of Friars Minor (Franciscans). In the aftermath of the Second Vatican Council, Bishop Kurz was a traditionalist Catholic voice.

See also
 Catholic Church in Germany
 Catholic Church in South Africa
 Catholic Church in China

External sources

Eberhard Heller: H. E. Mgr. Blasius Sigebald Kurz O.F.M. died thirty years ago. In: Insight 33, 9 (2003) 302.
Oskar Schmitt: A worthy steward in the vineyard of our Lord Jesus Christ: Bishop Pierre Martin Ngo-dinh-Thuc. Books on Demand GmbH 2006, 186f. ISBN 978-3833453854

References

External links
 Bishop Blasius Sigibald Kurz, O.F.M. at Catholic-Heirarchy.org
 Bishop Blaise Backs Traditionalists at Catholic News Archive
 Bishop Blaise S. Kurz, 79, Of Catholic Traditionalists at New York Times

1894 births
1973 deaths
Friars Minor
German Franciscans
German traditionalist Catholics
People from Heidenheim (district)
Participants in the Second Vatican Council
Bishops appointed by Pope Pius XII
20th-century German Roman Catholic bishops
South African Roman Catholic bishops
20th-century Roman Catholic titular bishops
Chinese Roman Catholic bishops

de:Blasius Kurz
fr:Blasius Kurz
no:Blasius Kurz
pl:Blasius Kurz